The 1984–85 NBA season was the Detroit Pistons' 37th season in the NBA and 28th season in the city of Detroit.
Due to repairs to their home at the time, Pontiac Silverdome, the Pistons spent the latter part of the season – and all five of their post-season games – at the Detroit Red Wings' arena, Joe Louis Arena, in Detroit proper.

Detroit continued their winning ways, finishing the season 46–36 (.561), 2nd place in the Central Division.  The team advanced to the playoffs, defeating the New Jersey Nets 3–0, for the franchise's first playoff series win since 1976, but fell 4–2 to Larry Bird and the Boston Celtics in the conference semi-finals.  1985 was also perhaps the start of bad blood between the Chicago Bulls and star Michael Jordan and the Pistons.  At the 1985 NBA All-Star Game, reports were that Pistons star Isiah Thomas and friend Los Angeles Lakers star Magic Johnson conspired to "freeze-out" rookie Jordan on the national stage.  As the Pistons and Bulls battled over the next few years, Jordan may have extracted his revenge in ensuring Thomas was not named to the 1992 Olympic Dream Team.  

The Pistons were led in 1984–85 by Thomas (21.2 ppg, 13.9 apg, NBA All-Star) and center Bill Laimbeer (17.5 ppg, 12.4 rpg, NBA All-Star).

Draft picks

Roster

Regular season

Season standings

z – clinched division title
y – clinched division title
x – clinched playoff spot

Record vs. opponents

Game log

Regular season

|- align="center" bgcolor="#ffcccc"
| 1
| October 26, 1984
| Boston
| L 123–130
|
|
|
| Pontiac Silverdome
| 0–1
|- align="center" bgcolor="#ffcccc"
| 2
| October 27, 1984
| @ New York
| L 118–137
|
|
|
| Madison Square Garden
| 0–2
|- align="center" bgcolor="#ccffcc"
| 3
| October 30, 1984
| Cleveland
| W 124–107
|
|
|
| Pontiac Silverdome
| 1–2

|- align="center" bgcolor="#ccffcc"
| 4
| November 1, 1984
| @ Atlanta
| W 118–114
|
|
|
| The Omni
| 2–2
|- align="center" bgcolor="#ffcccc"
| 5
| November 2, 1984
| @ Boston
| L 116–127
|
|
|
| Boston Garden
| 2–3
|- align="center" bgcolor="#ccffcc"
| 6
| November 5, 1984
| @ Cleveland
| W 107–98
|
|
|
| Richfield Coliseum
| 3–3
|- align="center" bgcolor="#ffcccc"
| 7
| November 7, 1984
| Chicago
| L 118–122
|
|
|
| Pontiac Silverdome
| 3–4
|- align="center" bgcolor="#ccffcc"
| 8
| November 10, 1984
| Milwaukee
| W 104–100
|
|
|
| Pontiac Silverdome
| 4–4
|- align="center" bgcolor="#ccffcc"
| 9
| November 14, 1984
| @ Philadelphia
| W 137–133 (OT)
|
|
|
| The Spectrum
| 5–4
|- align="center" bgcolor="#ffcccc"
| 10
| November 16, 1984
| Philadelphia
| L 90–101
|
|
|
| Pontiac Silverdome
| 5–5
|- align="center" bgcolor="#ccffcc"
| 11
| November 17, 1984
| @ Dallas
| W 124–110
|
|
|
| Reunion Arena
| 6–5
|- align="center" bgcolor="#ffcccc"
| 12
| November 20, 1984
| @ Houston
| L 117–123
|
|
|
| The Summit
| 6–6
|- align="center" bgcolor="#ccffcc"
| 13
| November 21, 1984
| @ San Antonio
| W 114–101
|
|
|
| HemisFair Arena
| 7–6
|- align="center" bgcolor="#ffcccc"
| 14
| November 23, 1984
| New York
| L 97–120
|
|
|
| Pontiac Silverdome
| 7–7
|- align="center" bgcolor="#ffcccc"
| 15
| November 24, 1984
| @ Washington
| L 106–112
|
|
|
| Capital Centre
| 7–8
|- align="center" bgcolor="#ccffcc"
| 16
| November 28, 1984
| Portland
| W 120–113
|
|
|
| Pontiac Silverdome
| 8–8
|- align="center" bgcolor="#ffcccc"
| 17
| November 30, 1984
| Washington
| L 106–114
|
|
|
| Pontiac Silverdome
| 8–9

|- align="center" bgcolor="#ccffcc"
| 18
| December 1, 1984
| @ Indiana
| W 131–109
|
|
|
| Market Square Arena
| 9–9
|- align="center" bgcolor="#ccffcc"
| 19
| December 4, 1984
| Boston
| W 104–99
|
|
|
| Pontiac Silverdome
| 10–9
|- align="center" bgcolor="#ffcccc"
| 20
| December 6, 1984
| @ Milwaukee
| L 99–114
|
|
|
| MECCA Arena
| 10–10
|- align="center" bgcolor="#ccffcc"
| 21
| December 7, 1984
| Denver
| W 122–115
|
|
|
| Pontiac Silverdome
| 11–10
|- align="center" bgcolor="#ccffcc"
| 22
| December 11, 1984
| @ Chicago
| W 108–101
|
|
|
| Chicago Stadium
| 12–10
|- align="center" bgcolor="#ccffcc"
| 23
| December 12, 1984
| Chicago
| W 102–95
|
|
|
| Pontiac Silverdome
| 13–10
|- align="center" bgcolor="#ccffcc"
| 24
| December 14, 1984
| Indiana
| W 120–96
|
|
|
| Pontiac Silverdome
| 14–10
|- align="center" bgcolor="#ccffcc"
| 25
| December 19, 1984
| @ Denver
| W 148–129
|
|
|
| McNichols Sports Arena
| 15–10
|- align="center" bgcolor="#ffcccc"
| 26
| December 20, 1984
| @ Utah
| L 116–117
|
|
|
| Salt Palace Acord Arena
| 15–11
|- align="center" bgcolor="#ffcccc"
| 27
| December 22, 1984
| @ Kansas City
| L 123–129
|
|
|
| Kemper Arena
| 15–12
|- align="center" bgcolor="#ffcccc"
| 28
| December 25, 1984
| Philadelphia
| L 108–109
|
|
|
| Pontiac Silverdome
| 15–13
|- align="center" bgcolor="#ffcccc"
| 29
| December 26, 1984
| @ New Jersey
| L 97–112
|
|
|
| Brendan Byrne Arena
| 15–14
|- align="center" bgcolor="#ccffcc"
| 30
| December 28, 1984
| @ Indiana
| W 116–110
|
|
|
| Market Square Arena
| 16–14
|- align="center" bgcolor="#ffcccc"
| 31
| December 29, 1984
| New Jersey
| L 108–110
|
|
|
| Pontiac Silverdome
| 16–15

|- align="center" bgcolor="#ccffcc"
| 32
| January 2, 1985
| Cleveland
| W 108–100
|
|
|
| Pontiac Silverdome
| 17–15
|- align="center" bgcolor="#ccffcc"
| 33
| January 4, 1985
| Atlanta
| W 134–111
|
|
|
| Pontiac Silverdome
| 18–15
|- align="center" bgcolor="#ccffcc"
| 34
| January 5, 1985
| @ Washington
| W 121–113
|
|
|
| Capital Centre
| 19–15
|- align="center" bgcolor="#ffcccc"
| 35
| January 9, 1985
| @ Philadelphia
| L 122–126
|
|
|
| The Spectrum
| 19–16
|- align="center" bgcolor="#ccffcc"
| 36
| January 11, 1985
| Indiana
| W 120–109
|
|
|
| Pontiac Silverdome
| 20–16
|- align="center" bgcolor="#ccffcc"
| 37
| January 13, 198512Noon EST
| L.A. Lakers
| W 121–98
| Thomas (30)
| Roundfield (14)
| Thomas (20)
| Pontiac Silverdome23,475
| 21–16
|- align="center" bgcolor="#ccffcc"
| 38
| January 17, 1985
| @ New York
| W 105–89
|
|
|
| Madison Square Garden
| 22–16
|- align="center" bgcolor="#ccffcc"
| 39
| January 19, 1985
| @ New Jersey
| W 109–107
|
|
|
| Brendan Byrne Arena
| 23–16
|- align="center" bgcolor="#ccffcc"
| 40
| January 22, 1985
| @ Atlanta
| W 130–113
|
|
|
| Lakefront Arena
| 24–16
|- align="center" bgcolor="#ccffcc"
| 41
| January 24, 1985
| Golden State
| W 137–118
|
|
|
| Pontiac Silverdome
| 25–16
|- align="center" bgcolor="#ccffcc"
| 42
| January 26, 1985
| Seattle
| W 132–113
|
|
|
| Pontiac Silverdome
| 27–16
|- align="center" bgcolor="#ccffcc"
| 43
| January 27, 1985
| Washington
| W 115–105
|
|
|
| Pontiac Silverdome
| 27–16
|- align="center" bgcolor="#ffcccc"
| 44
| January 29, 1985
| @ Boston
| L 130–131
|
|
|
| Hartford Civic Center
| 27–17
|- align="center" bgcolor="#ccffcc"
| 45
| January 30, 1985
| Kansas City
| W 120–116
|
|
|
| Pontiac Silverdome
| 28–17

|- align="center" bgcolor="#ccffcc"
| 46
| February 2, 1985
| Atlanta
| W 110–102 (OT)
|
|
|
| Pontiac Silverdome
| 29–17
|- align="center" bgcolor="#ccffcc"
| 47
| February 4, 1985
| @ Milwaukee
| W 113–111 (OT)
|
|
|
| MECCA Arena
| 30–17
|- align="center" bgcolor="#ffcccc"
| 48
| February 5, 1985
| New Jersey
| L 117–119
|
|
|
| Pontiac Silverdome
| 30–18
|- align="center" bgcolor="#ffcccc"
| 49
| February 7, 1985
| @ Washington
| L 126–128 (2OT)
|
|
|
| Capital Centre
| 30–19
|- align="center"
|colspan="9" bgcolor="#bbcaff"|All-Star Break
|- style="background:#cfc;"
|- bgcolor="#bbffbb"
|- align="center" bgcolor="#ffcccc"
| 50
| February 12, 1985
| @ Chicago
| L 126–139 (OT)
|
|
|
| Chicago Stadium
| 30–20
|- align="center" bgcolor="#ccffcc"
| 51
| February 13, 1985
| Dallas
| W 124–119
|
|
|
| Pontiac Silverdome
| 31–20
|- align="center" bgcolor="#ffcccc"
| 52
| February 15, 1985
| @ New Jersey
| L 123–124
|
|
|
| Brendan Byrne Arena
| 31–21
|- align="center" bgcolor="#ffcccc"
| 53
| February 16, 1985
| Philadelphia
| L 114–125
|
|
|
| Pontiac Silverdome
| 31–22
|- align="center" bgcolor="#ccffcc"
| 54
| February 18, 1985
| Phoenix
| W 122–103
|
|
|
| Pontiac Silverdome
| 32–22
|- align="center" bgcolor="#ffcccc"
| 55
| February 20, 1985
| Milwaukee
| L 112–113
|
|
|
| Pontiac Silverdome
| 32–23
|- align="center" bgcolor="#ffcccc"
| 56
| February 22, 1985
| @ Philadelphia
| L 99–110
|
|
|
| The Spectrum
| 32–24
|- align="center" bgcolor="#ffcccc"
| 57
| February 23, 1985
| New Jersey
| L 103–111
|
|
|
| Pontiac Silverdome
| 32–25
|- align="center" bgcolor="#ccffcc"
| 58
| February 27, 1985
| Chicago
| W 108–99
|
|
|
| Pontiac Silverdome
| 33–25

|- align="center" bgcolor="#ffcccc"
| 59
| March 1, 1985
| San Antonio
| L 98–108
|
|
|
| Pontiac Silverdome
| 33–26
|- align="center" bgcolor="#ffcccc"
| 60
| March 3, 1985
| @ Boston
| L 129–138
|
|
|
| Boston Garden
| 33–27
|- align="center" bgcolor="#ccffcc"
| 61
| March 6, 1985
| New York
| W 114–90
|
|
|
| Joe Louis Arena
| 34–27
|- align="center" bgcolor="#ffcccc"
| 62
| March 7, 1985
| Utah
| L 114–122
|
|
|
| Joe Louis Arena
| 34–28
|- align="center" bgcolor="#ccffcc"
| 63
| March 9, 1985
| @ Atlanta
| W 115–113
|
|
|
| The Omni
| 35–28
|- align="center" bgcolor="#ccffcc"
| 64
| March 11, 1985
| L.A. Clippers
| W 121–114
|
|
|
| Joe Louis Arena
| 36–28
|- align="center" bgcolor="#ffcccc"
| 65
| March 12, 1985
| @ Chicago
| L 110–111
|
|
|
| Chicago Stadium
| 36–29
|- align="center" bgcolor="#ffcccc"
| 66
| March 17, 1985
| @ Seattle
| L 98–106
|
|
|
| Kingdome
| 36–30
|- align="center" bgcolor="#ffcccc"
| 67
| March 18, 1985
| @ L.A. Clippers
| L 116–136
|
|
|
| Los Angeles Memorial Sports Arena
| 36–31
|- align="center" bgcolor="#ffcccc"
| 68
| March 19, 1985
| @ Portland
| L 123–143
|
|
|
| Memorial Coliseum
| 36–32
|- align="center" bgcolor="#ccffcc"
| 69
| March 21, 1985
| @ Golden State
| W 122–113
|
|
|
| Oakland-Alameda County Coliseum Arena
| 38–33
|- align="center" bgcolor="#ffcccc"
| 70
| March 24, 198510:30p.m. EST
| @ L.A. Lakers
| L 130–148
| Thomas (30)
| Laimbeer (14)
| Thomas (15)
| The Forum17,505
| 37–33
|- align="center" bgcolor="#ccffcc"
| 71
| March 26, 1985
| @ Phoenix
| W 119–93
|
|
|
| Arizona Veterans Memorial Coliseum
| 38–33
|- align="center" bgcolor="#ccffcc"
| 72
| March 27, 1985
| Houston
| W 127–110
|
|
|
| Joe Louis Arena
| 39–33
|- align="center" bgcolor="#ccffcc"
| 73
| March 31, 1985
| Boston
| W 113–105
|
|
|
| Joe Louis Arena
| 40–33

|- align="center" bgcolor="#ffcccc"
| 74
| April 1, 1985
| Atlanta
| L 100–114
|
|
|
| Joe Louis Arena
| 40–34
|- align="center" bgcolor="#ccffcc"
| 75
| April 2, 1985
| @ Indiana
| W 124–121
|
|
|
| Market Square Arena
| 41–34
|- align="center" bgcolor="#ffcccc"
| 76
| April 4, 1985
| @ Milwaukee
| L 121–130
|
|
|
| MECCA Arena
| 41–35
|- align="center" bgcolor="#ffcccc"
| 77
| April 5, 1985
| Cleveland
| L 118–119
|
|
|
| Joe Louis Arena
| 41–36
|- align="center" bgcolor="#ccffcc"
| 78
| April 7, 1985
| Milwaukee
| W 113–91
|
|
|
| Joe Louis Arena
| 42–36
|- align="center" bgcolor="#ccffcc"
| 79
| April 9, 1985
| @ New York
| W 107–97
|
|
|
| Madison Square Garden
| 43–36
|- align="center" bgcolor="#ccffcc"
| 80
| April 10, 1985
| Indiana
| W 116–114
|
|
|
| Joe Louis Arena
| 44–36
|- align="center" bgcolor="#ccffcc"
| 81
| April 12, 1985
| Washington
| W 102–96
|
|
|
| Joe Louis Arena
| 45–36
|- align="center" bgcolor="#ccffcc"
| 82
| April 14, 1985
| @ Cleveland
| W 116–113
|
|
|
| Richfield Coliseum
| 46–36

Playoffs

|- align="center" bgcolor="#ccffcc"
| 1
| April 18, 1985
| New Jersey
| W 125–105
| Bill Laimbeer (23)
| Bill Laimbeer (13)
| Isiah Thomas (11)
| Joe Louis Arena10,465
| 1–0
|- align="center" bgcolor="#ccffcc"
| 2
| April 21, 1985
| New Jersey
| W 121–111
| Isiah Thomas (29)
| Bill Laimbeer (12)
| Isiah Thomas (14)
| Joe Louis Arena11,501
| 2–0
|- align="center" bgcolor="#ccffcc"
| 3
| April 24, 1985
| @ New Jersey
| W 116–115
| Terry Tyler (23)
| Tripucka, Tyler (11)
| Isiah Thomas (11)
| Brendan Byrne Arena9,999
| 3–0
|-

|- align="center" bgcolor="#ffcccc"
| 1
| April 28, 1985
| @ Boston
| L 99–133
| Isiah Thomas (23)
| three players tied (5)
| Isiah Thomas (8)
| Boston Garden14,890
| 0–1
|- align="center" bgcolor="#ffcccc"
| 2
| April 30, 1985
| @ Boston
| L 114–121
| Isiah Thomas (28)
| Thomas, Laimbeer (9)
| Isiah Thomas (15)
| Boston Garden14,890
| 0–2
|- align="center" bgcolor="#ccffcc"
| 3
| May 2, 1985
| Boston
| W 125–117
| Bill Laimbeer (27)
| Bill Laimbeer (13)
| Isiah Thomas (16)
| Joe Louis Arena14,209
| 1–2
|- align="center" bgcolor="#ccffcc"
| 4
| May 5, 1985
| Boston
| W 102–99
| Vinnie Johnson (34)
| Bill Laimbeer (12)
| Isiah Thomas (10)
| Joe Louis Arena14,350
| 2–2
|- align="center" bgcolor="#ffcccc"
| 5
| May 8, 1985
| @ Boston
| L 123–130
| Vinnie Johnson (30)
| Bill Laimbeer (13)
| Isiah Thomas (7)
| Boston Garden14,890
| 2–3
|- align="center" bgcolor="#ffcccc"
| 6
| May 10, 1985
| Boston
| L 113–123
| Isiah Thomas (37)
| Bill Laimbeer (13)
| Isiah Thomas (9)
| Joe Louis Arena21,193
| 2–4
|-

Awards and records
Isiah Thomas, All-NBA First Team

References

See also
1984–85 NBA season

Detroit Pistons seasons
Det
Detroit Pistons
Detroit Pistons